Jack Burke may refer to:

Jack Burke Jr. (born 1923), American golfer
Jack Burke Sr. (1888–1943), American golfer
Jack Burke (boxer) (1875–1942), American boxer known for fighting the longest boxing match in history
Jack Burke (footballer) (1918–2004), Australian footballer, who played for Hawthorn
Jack Burke (cyclist) (born 1995), Canadian cyclist

See also
John Burke (disambiguation)